Prieto is a surname of Spanish origin. It may refer to:

Abelardo Escobar Prieto (1938–2019), Mexican government official
Alfredo Prieto (1965–2015), Salvadoran-American serial killer
Amy Prieto, Colombian-American chemist
Antonio Prieto (1926–2011), Chilean actor
Carlos Prieto (born 1937), Mexican cellist
Chris Prieto (born 1972), American baseball player and coach
Guillermo Prieto (1818–1897), Mexican writer and government official
Indalecio Prieto (1883–1962), Spanish politician
Isabel Prieto de Landázuri (1833–1876), Spanish-Mexican poet and dramatist
José Joaquín Prieto (1786–1854), 4th president of Chile
Juan António Prieto, Spanish paralympic runner
Juan Carlos Prieto, Spanish paralympic high jumper
Lorene Prieto, Chilean-New Zealander actor
Manuel Bulnes Prieto (1799–1866), general and 5th president of Chile
Manuel García-Prieto, 1st Marquis of Alhucemas (1859–1938), Spanish prime minister
Margarita Prieto Yegros (1936–2017), Paraguayan writer and journalist
Óscar Vargas Prieto (1917–1989), Peruvian soldier
Rafael Reyes Prieto (1849–1921), general and president of Colombia
Rodrigo Prieto (born 1965), Mexican cinematographer
Rosario Prieto (born 1942), actress from Dominican Republic
Victorio Riego Prieto (1932–2009), Paraguayan chess master
Wilfredo Prieto (born 1978), Cuban artist

See also
Juan Prieto (disambiguation)

References

Spanish-language surnames